The 1988–89 season was Kilmarnock's 87th in Scottish League Competitions. They were relegated to the third tier at the end of the season.

Scottish First Division

Scottish League Cup

Second round

Scottish Cup

See also 
List of Kilmarnock F.C. seasons

References

External links 
https://www.fitbastats.com/kilmarnock/team_results_season.php

Kilmarnock F.C. seasons
Kilmarnock